Gbolahan is a given name. Notable people with the given name include:

Gbolahan Mudasiru (1945–2003), Nigerian Air Force officer and politician
Gbolahan Olusegun Yishawu (born 1967), Nigerian politician
Gbolahan Salami (born 1991), Nigerian footballer

African masculine given names